The 56th Grand Bell Awards, also known as Daejong Film Awards, is determined and presented annually by The Motion Pictures Association of Korea for excellence in film in South Korea. The Grand Bell Awards were first presented in 1962 and have gained prestige as the Korean equivalent of the American Academy Awards. The ceremony was originally scheduled to be held on February 25, 2020, but was postponed due to the COVID-19 pandemic. The ceremony was held on June 3, 2020.

Juries
 Lee Jang-ho, Film director (Jury President)
 Kwak Young-jin, Film criticism
 Kim Min-oh, Art director
 Kim Byung-in, Korea Scenario Writers Association
 Kim Chung-kang, Professor of Theater and Film (Hanyang University)
 Kim Hyo-jeong, Film criticism
 Mo Eun-young, Programmer (Bucheon International Fantastic Film Festival)
 Seong Seung-Taek, Cinematographer
 Lee Chang-se, Department of Media and Image Production (Far East University)

Winners and nominees 

The nominees for the 56th Grand Bell Awards were announced on 17 January 2020.

Awards 
Winners are listed first, highlighted in boldface, and indicated with a double dagger.

Films that received multiple awards and nominations 
The following films received multiple wins:

See also 

56th Baeksang Arts Awards
40th Blue Dragon Film Awards
28th Buil Film Awards

References 

2020 film awards
Grand Bell Awards
2020 in South Korean cinema
Events in Seoul